Sekolah Menengah Kebangsaan Kok Lanas (Kok Lanas government secondary school) is a coeducational day school located in Kampung Kok Lanas, Kota Bharu, Kelantan, Malaysia.

Enrolment levels have increased over recent years from 1158 students in 2007 to 1260 in 2010 (644 boys and 616 girls). There are 78 teachers, giving a staff-student ratio of 16.

References

External links 
 SMK Kok Lanas school website

Kota Bharu
Secondary schools in Malaysia
Educational institutions established in 1990
1990 establishments in Malaysia
Publicly funded schools in Malaysia